Guillaumes is a commune in the Alpes-Maritimes department in southeastern France.

It was part of the historic County of Nice until 1860 as Guglielmi.

The Valberg ski resort is, in part, located on this town.

Geography
The commune is situated along the river Var, and at the beginning of the Gorges de Daluis.

Population

See also
 Communes of the Alpes-Maritimes department

References

Communes of Alpes-Maritimes
Alpes-Maritimes communes articles needing translation from French Wikipedia